Mandawa Fort is an important heritage site of Shekhawati.  It was built by the then Thakur Nawal Singh Bahadur at Mandawa town, situated in Jhunjhunu district of Rajasthan, India. The fort is now run as a hotel by the Rajasthan Tourism Department.

External links 
 

Forts in Rajasthan